The 2019 Global Rapid Rugby season was a showcase series for seven rugby union teams played in locations across the Asia-Pacific region. Global Rapid Rugby originally planned a full home and away tournament followed by finals, with eight teams competing in 2019. The competition launch was postponed by a year, however, due to the short time frame following World Rugby approval in November 2018. A scaled-down showcase series of fourteen matches was arranged instead.

Teams
Seven teams played in the Rapid Rugby Showcase in 2019:

Notes

Standings
A modified version of the standard Rugby union bonus points system was used, with bonus points awarded for:
 a team scoring 4 or more tries in a game;
 a winning team scoring at least 3 tries more than their opponent; 
 a losing team defeated by a margin of 5 points or under.

Four points were awarded for a win and none for a loss; two points were awarded to each team for a match ending in a draw.

Showcase Series

Showcase opener

Asia Showcase

Asia Rd 1

Asia Rd 2

Asia Rd 3

Asia Rd 4

Asia Rd 5

Asia Rd 6

Pacific Showcase

Pac Rd 1

Pac Rd 2

Pac Rd 3

Pac Rd 4

Pac Rd 5

Pac Rd 6

Bledisloe Showcase

Other matches

Media coverage
Rapid Rugby had live broadcast television coverage in 18 countries across Asia and Oceania in 2019. Live streaming and video on demand services reached additional viewers within some Asia-Pacific countries, while Rapid Rugby's own website provided live streams and highlight packages to other regions worldwide.

Nine of the fourteen matches of 2019 showcase series were televised. Fox Sports in Australia and related companies Star Sports and Fox Sports Asia provided the live coverage.

National broadcaster SBS showed all nine of these matches live on free-to-air television across Australia via its SBS Viceland channel and also streamed through SBS on Demand. Other Rapid Rugby media partners included Kayo Sports in Australia, Sky Sport in New Zealand and Fiji TV.

Notes

References

External links
 Rapid Rugby official website
 

Global Rapid Rugby
Global Rapid Rugby
Global Rapid Rugby